Givens Corner is an unincorporated community in Yakima County, Washington, United States, located approximately three miles west of Grandview.

References

Unincorporated communities in Yakima County, Washington
Unincorporated communities in Washington (state)